George Adam Shaffer (June 20, 1910 – April 23, 1971) was a professional American football player for the Pittsburgh Pirates. He attended high school in Greensburg, Pennsylvania.  He attended Washington & Jefferson College.

References

External links
 

1910 births
1971 deaths
American football quarterbacks
Pittsburgh Pirates (football) players
People from Westmoreland County, Pennsylvania
Washington & Jefferson Presidents football players
Players of American football from Pennsylvania
Sportspeople from the Pittsburgh metropolitan area